Brebovnica is a dispersed settlement in the Municipality of Gorenja Vas–Poljane in the Upper Carniola region of Slovenia.

References

External links 

Brebovnica on Geopedia

Populated places in the Municipality of Gorenja vas-Poljane